Turkmenistan elects on national level a head of state — the president — and a legislature. The elections in Turkmenistan since its split from the Soviet Union have been widely criticized for being completely fraudulent and attempting to give an appearance of legitimacy to what is in reality a dictatorship. Parties in Turkmenistan are the Democratic Party of Turkmenistan and the Party of Industrialists and Entrepreneurs. The president has a seven year term, while the legislature has a five-year term.

Presidential elections 

On declaring independence from the Soviet Union, the president was to be elected for a five-year term by the people. President Saparmurat Niyazov, was elected unopposed on 21 June 1992. In a referendum in January 1994, it was decided that he would be president for eight more years. In 1999, the country's parliament named him president for life. He died on 21 December 2006.  An election to replace him was held on 11 February 2007, which was won by ruling party candidate Gurbanguly Berdimuhamedow.

Legislative elections 

Turkmenistan elects a legislature on a national level. The Assembly (Mejlis) has 125 members, elected for a five-year term in single seat constituencies. Political parties are the Democratic Party of Turkmenistan (TDP), the Agrarian Party of Turkmenistan (TAP) and the Party of Industrialists and Entrepreneurs (TSwTP). Prior to 2008, Turkmenistan was a one-party state under the TDP. The Khalk Maslakhaty (People's Council) which is considered the ultimate representative body, has more than 2,500 members; it was abolished in late 2008. All legal parties currently support the government.

Latest elections

Presidential election

Assembly election

People's Council election

See also
 Electoral calendar
 Electoral system

Notes

References

External links
Turkmens "vote"
Adam Carr's Election Archive